Parliamentary elections were held in Colombia on 11 March 2018 to elect 102 members of the Senate and 165 members of the House of Representatives.

Electoral system
The Chamber of Representatives consisted of 172 members; 162 were elected by proportional representation from 33 multi-member constituencies based on the departments, with seats allocated using the largest remainder method. Two members were elected by the Afro-Colombian community and one by the indigenous community. Although a new constituency had been created for the Raizal minority, legislation had not been approved to allow the election to take place. A further five seats were reserved for FARC and one for the running mate of the runner-up in the presidential election as part of the Colombian peace process.

The Senate consisted of 108 members; 100 were elected a single nationwide constituency by proportional representation (with seats allocated using the largest remainder); two were elected from a two-seat constituency for indigenous Colombians; five were reserved for FARC and one for the runner-up in the presidential election.

Candidates
 Green Alliance
 National Integration Party
 Colombian Conservative Party
 Democratic Center
 Movimiento Todos Somos Colombia
 Radical Change
 Colombian Liberal Party
 Grupo Significativo de Ciudadanos Colombia Justa Libres
 Grupo Significativo de Ciudadanos Unión con Fortaleza
 Alternative Democratic Pole
 Social Party of National Unity
 Common Alternative Revolutionary Force
 Grupo Significativo de Ciudadanos Sí Se Puede
 Independent Movement of Absolute Renovation
 
  (Indigenous Social Alliance Movement, Unión Patriótica and Indigenous and Social Alternative Movement)

Opinion polls

Results

Senate

Chamber of Representatives

Notes

References

External links
The Liberal Party and the upcoming elections 

Colombia
Parliamentary election
Parliamentary elections in Colombia